Dogs Eating Dogs is an EP by American rock band Blink-182, released on December 18, 2012 independently. Self-produced by the group and Chris Holmes, it was the sole recording that the band self-released after their departure from Interscope/DGC in October 2012, as well as their last studio recording with Tom DeLonge until 2022.

To celebrate the 182nd day of 2020 (June 30), the EP was pressed on vinyl as a limited edition.

Recording and production
After Neighborhoods, the band felt the recording methods used were inadequate. Tom DeLonge, who originally advocated the method of using separate studios/e-mails to dictate the majority of the recording, admitted that it led to a loss of unity. Travis Barker noted that, "there's some songs on there that I love, but for the most part it was disconnected. It was like, 'You do this part in your studio, and then you're gonna play on it and send it back to me.' When we're not in the studio together, you don't have the opportunity to gel off each other." In addition, Barker was still recovering from his plane crash in 2008; he stated he was a "bloody mess" at the time. During the band's 20th Anniversary Tour in Europe, Barker was the first to approach DeLonge and Hoppus with the idea of immediately returning to the studio in the fall. "It was like three days after Halloween and Tom was like, 'Dude, we should do that!'" They entered the studio on November 5. They found a flexibility to do things their own way without label intervention and it inspired creativity and agility. Mark Hoppus described: "It was great, ideas falling everywhere. Lots of long hours spent on five new songs. [...] The band is in a great place creatively. Having everyone in the same room at the same time makes all the difference for us."

Composition

The EP's opening track, "When I Was Young", revisits childhood from an adult viewpoint. Spin described the track as "cynical but sentimental", comparing the opening pipe organ to Arcade Fire. The title track is led by Hoppus and has been compared to Hoppus and Barker's previous side project, +44, and the band Alkaline Trio. Alternative Press referred to it as the "angriest, most aggressive song" on the EP. "Disaster" opens with "manipulated radio frequencies and anthemic marching drum hits" that recalls DeLonge's band Angels & Airwaves. "Boxing Day", originally titled "The Day After Christmas", began as an acoustic folk number before Barker added an electronic drum kit, creating what Hoppus described as a "real kind of indie, strange, cool vibe to it." A week prior to the EP's release, the song "Boxing Day" was streamed through Alternative Press. The fifth and final track, "Pretty Little Girl", was originally titled "I Got My Eye on You" and was written by DeLonge for his wife. It features a guest appearance from rapper Yelawolf. The track carries a new wave influence and synthesizers are most prominent in the mix.

Gregory Heaney of AllMusic said that the EP, like Neighborhoods, explores "a more expansive prog-punk sound", similar to Hoppus and Barker’s aforementioned side project +44.

Reception

Commercial performance
Dogs Eating Dogs debuted on the Billboard 200 at number 23 during the week of January 5, 2013, with first-week sales of 57,000 copies.

Critical reception

Dogs Eating Dogs received generally positive reviews from music critics. Scott Heisel of Alternative Press gave it a pre-release review of high acclaim saying it is "just as strong if not stronger than anything on Neighborhoods." Keagan Ilvonen of AbsolutePunk stated that the EP is "a refreshing but yet an exciting point in their career. They aren’t afraid to experiment and fail, while still continuing on with the legacy they've created. While the EP isn't the best material of the band's career, it shows a promising future that looked ever so bleak just a mere three years ago. If the band continues on this path, they are sure to please not only their fans, but also themselves as they age". Allmusic writer Gregory Heaney said the EP "will surprise anyone who might have tuned out after 'All the Small Things' dominated the airwaves, but given the newfound maturity in their sound, the change is one that's both expected and welcomed." Kerrang! writer Paul Travers said "the overall effect is one of a versatile, diffuse, but somehow far more focused collection of songs than were present on Neighborhoods. Added with those elements of their classic sound and what we have here is a stopgap EP that promises even greater things ahead for blink-182."

In 2013, Chris Payne of Billboard referred to the EP as "underrated."

Track listing

Personnel
Blink-182
Mark Hoppus – bass guitar, vocals, producer
Tom DeLonge – guitars, vocals, synthesizers, producer
Travis Barker – drums, percussion, keyboards, synthesizers, producer

Production
Chris Holmes – co-producer
Aaron Rubin – engineer
Franco Vescovi – cover artwork 
Additional musicians
Yelawolf – vocals on "Pretty Little Girl"

Chart performance

References

Blink-182 albums
2012 EPs
Albums produced by Mark Hoppus
Albums produced by Tom DeLonge
Albums produced by Travis Barker